Who Dat (AAVE for "who is that?") can mean:

 Who Dat?, the name of a support chant by fans of the New Orleans Saints
 "Who Dat" (J. Cole song)
 "Who Dat" (JT Money song)
 "Who Dat" (Young Jeezy song)